Motwani is a surname of Sindhi Hindus. Notable people with the surname include:

 Hansika Motwani (born 1991), Indian film actress
 Neel Motwani, Indian TV actor
 Paul Motwani (born 1962), Scottish chess grandmaster
 Rajeev Motwani (1962–2009), Indian computer scientist
 Rohit Motwani (born 1990), Indian cricketer 
 Sulajja Firodia Motwani (born 1970), Indian entrepreneur
 Sital K Motwani (born 1932), Hong Kong businessman
 Aditya Motwani (born 2001), Indian Journalist